Hoyos en la Bolsa (Holes in the Pocket) (1996) is the thirteenth studio album by Mexican rock and blues band El Tri. The album cover references the songs on the album.

Track listing 

 "Todo Sea Por el Rocanrol" (All For Rock`N Roll) (Alex Lora) – 4:44
 "Pamela" (Lora, Oscar Zárate) – 4:41
 "Perdónanos la Deuda" (Forgive Us The Debt) (Lora) – 3:59
 "La Caja Idiota" (Television set) (Lora) – 2:48
 "El Fantasma" (The Ghost) (Lora) – 3:42
 "El Enmascarado de Látex" (The Condom (a play on the wrestler Santo's nickname, "el enmascarado de plata")) (Lora, Francisco Barrios) – 4:13
 "Ruta 100" (Jorge Garcia, Adrian Nuñez) – 3:52
 "Trabajo Pesado" (Heavy Work) (Lora, Eduardo Chico) – 3:26
 "Que Regrese Salinas" (Let Salinas Return) (Lora) – 6:08
 "Hoyos en la Bolsa" (Holes In The Pocket) (Lora) – 3:37
 "El Canal" (The Channel) (Lora) – 5:51

Personnel 

 Alex Lora – guitar, vocals, producer, mixing
 Rafael Salgado – harmonic
 Eduardo Chico – guitar
 Oscar Zarate – guitar
 Pedro Martínez – drums, backing vocals
 Ruben Soriano – bass
 Chela DeLora – backing vocals, concept
 Lalo Toral – piano
 Zbigniew Paleta – violin

Guest musicians 

 Felipe Souza – electric & rhythm guitar, mixing
 Papo Blues – guitar

Technical personnel 

Chuck Johnson – mixing, mixing assistant, percussion
Richard Kaplan – engineer, mixing

External links
www.eltri.com.mx
Hoyos en la bolsa at MusicBrainz
[ Hoyos en la bolsa] at Allmusic

El Tri albums
1996 albums
Warner Music Group albums